Steamtown is an unincorporated community in Noble County, in the U.S. state of Ohio.

History
Steamtown had its start in 1840 when a steam gristmill was built at that point.

References

Unincorporated communities in Noble County, Ohio
Unincorporated communities in Ohio